is a Japanese mathematician at Kyoto University. In 1986, he proved Novikov's conjecture about the Riemann–Schottky problem by characterization of Jacobian varieties.

Shiota obtained his doctorate at Harvard University in 1984.

References

Year of birth missing (living people)
Living people
20th-century Japanese mathematicians
21st-century Japanese mathematicians
Harvard University alumni
Academic staff of Kyoto University